Minuscule 308 (in the Gregory-Aland numbering), α 456 (Soden), is a Greek minuscule manuscript of the New Testament, on paper. Palaeographically it has been assigned to the 14th century. 
Formerly it was labelled by 20a and 25p.

Description 

The codex contains the text of the Acts of the Apostles, Catholic epistles, and Pauline epistles on 145 paper leaves with numerous lacunae. The text is written in one column per page, in 22-23 lines per page.

It contains Prolegomena to the Catholic epistles and subscriptions at the end of each sacred book. 
The manuscript has survived in bad condition and almost illegible in some parts. 
The Pauline epistles precede the Acts and Catholic epistles.

Text 

The Greek text of the codex is a representative of the Byzantine text-type. Aland placed it in Category V.

History 

The manuscript was examined by Wettstein and Casley. C. R. Gregory saw it in 1883.

Formerly it was labelled by 20a and 25p. Gregory in 1908 gave number 308 for it.

The manuscript is currently housed at the British Library (Royal MS 1 B. I) in London.

See also 

 List of New Testament minuscules
 Biblical manuscript
 Textual criticism

References

Further reading 

 

Greek New Testament minuscules
14th-century biblical manuscripts
British Library Royal manuscripts